Sintayehu Sallalich (or Sintiahau Solelik, ; born 20 June 1991) is a professional footballer who plays as a winger for Cypriot First Division club Nea Salamis Famagusta FC. Born in Ethiopia, he has represented Israel at youth level.

Early life
Kinda was born in Qwara, Ethiopia, to an Ethiopian-Jewish family. He immigrated to Israel with his family, at the age of nine.

Club career statistics
Correct as of 1 June 2022.

Honours

Club

Maccabi Haifa
Israeli Premier League: 2010–11

Maribor
Slovenian PrvaLiga: 2014–15, 2016–17
Slovenian Cup: 2015–16
Slovenian Supercup: 2014

References

External links
NK Maribor profile 

UEFA profile

1991 births
Living people
Ethiopian Jews
Ethiopian emigrants to Israel
Citizens of Israel through Law of Return
Israeli Jews
Israeli footballers
Ethiopian footballers
Association football wingers
Maccabi Haifa F.C. players
Hapoel Acre F.C. players
Hapoel Ironi Kiryat Shmona F.C. players
Beitar Jerusalem F.C. players
NK Maribor players
Hapoel Be'er Sheva F.C. players
Gençlerbirliği S.K. footballers
Hapoel Tel Aviv F.C. players
Israeli Premier League players
Slovenian PrvaLiga players
TFF First League players
Israeli expatriate footballers
Expatriate footballers in Slovenia
Expatriate footballers in Turkey
Israeli expatriate sportspeople in Slovenia
Israeli expatriate sportspeople in Turkey
Israel youth international footballers
Israel under-21 international footballers